The 2017 PSAC football season was the 53rd year of college football in the Pennsylvania State Athletic Conference. The PSAC consists of 16 teams located throughout Pennsylvania.

Rankings

Standings

East Division

West Division

NFL draft

Teams

East Division
 Bloomsburg 
 Cheyney 
 East Stroudsburg 
 Kutztown 
 Lock Haven  
 Millersville 
 Shippensburg 
 West Chester

West Division
 California 
 Clarion 
 Edinboro 
 Gannon 
 IUP 
 Mercyhurst 
 Seton Hill 
 Slippery Rock

References